Highway 725 is a highway in the Canadian province of Saskatchewan. It runs from Highway 16 near Saltcoats to Highway 80.

See also 
Roads in Saskatchewan
Transportation in Saskatchewan

References 

725